Chrysoscota tanyphara is a moth of the family Erebidae first described by Alfred Jefferis Turner in 1940. It is found in Australia. The habitat consists of rainforests.

The larvae probably feeds on lichens.

References

Lithosiina
Moths described in 1940